Ana Amelia Menéndez Bernardo (born 17 March 1972) is a retired Spanish middle distance runner who competed in the 800 and 1500 metres. She finished eighth at the 1999 World Championships. She also competed at the 1996 Summer Olympics failing to finish her race.

Competition record

Personal bets
Outdoor
800 metres – 2:01.94 (Hengelo 1997)
1500 metres – 4:04.59 (Zürich 1999)
One mile – 4:35.38 (Seville 1997)
Indoor
800 metres – 2:03.39 (Genoa 1998)
1500 metres – 4:18.04 (Valencia 1999)

References

1972 births
Living people
Spanish female middle-distance runners
Athletes (track and field) at the 1996 Summer Olympics
Olympic athletes of Spain
World Athletics Championships athletes for Spain
Universiade medalists in athletics (track and field)
Universiade bronze medalists for Spain
Competitors at the 1997 Summer Universiade
Medalists at the 1999 Summer Universiade
20th-century Spanish women